The 1946 St. Louis Cardinals season was a season in American baseball. It was the team's 65th season in St. Louis, Missouri and the 55th season in the National League. The Cardinals went 96–58 during the championship season and finished tied with the Brooklyn Dodgers for first in the National League. St. Louis then won a best-of-three playoff for the pennant, 2 games to none. In the World Series, they won in 7 games over the Boston Red Sox. They won on Enos Slaughter's "mad dash" that gave them a 4–3 lead in the 8th inning of game 7.

Offseason
 Prior to 1946 season: Solly Hemus was signed as an amateur free agent by the Cardinals.

Regular season
First baseman Stan Musial won the MVP Award this year, batting .365, with 16 home runs and 103 RBIs.

Season standings

Record vs. opponents

Notable transactions
 July 1946: Jim Gleeson was traded by the Cardinals to the Boston Red Sox for Don Lang and Bill Howerton.

Roster

Player stats

Batting

Starters by position
Note: Pos = Position; G = Games played; AB = At bats; H = Hits; Avg. = Batting average; HR = Home runs; RBI = Runs batted in

Other batters
Note: G = Games played; AB = At bats; H = Hits; Avg. = Batting average; HR = Home runs; RBI = Runs batted in

Pitching

Starting pitchers
Note: G = Games pitched; IP = Innings pitched; W = Wins; L = Losses; ERA = Earned run average; SO = Strikeouts

Other pitchers
Note: G = Games pitched; IP = Innings pitched; W = Wins; L = Losses; ERA = Earned run average; SO = Strikeouts

Relief pitchers
Note: G = Games pitched; W = Wins; L = Losses; SV = Saves; ERA = Earned run average; SO = Strikeouts

1946 World Series 

NL St. Louis Cardinals (4) vs. AL Boston Red Sox (3)

Awards and honors
 Stan Musial, National League leader, Triples, (20).

Farm system

References

External links
1946 St. Louis Cardinals at Baseball Reference
1946 St. Louis Cardinals team page at www.baseball-almanac.com

St. Louis Cardinals seasons
Saint Louis Cardinals season
National League champion seasons
World Series champion seasons
St. Louis Cardinals